Emily Jane Atack (born 18 December 1989) is an English actress, comedian, and television personality. She is best known for playing Charlotte Hinchcliffe on the E4 comedy series The Inbetweeners (2008–2010), and for her roles in Keith Lemon shows, such as Lemon La Vida Loca, The Keith Lemon Sketch Show, and The Keith & Paddy Picture Show.

Atack appeared on the fifth series of Dancing on Ice in 2010. She was runner-up on the eighteenth series of I'm a Celebrity...Get Me Out of Here! in 2018, and went on to co-present the final series of its spin off show I'm a Celebrity: Extra Camp in 2019. Since 2020, she has starred in her own comedy series The Emily Atack Show.

Early life
Emily Jane Atack was born in Luton on 18 December 1989, the daughter of actress Kate Robbins and musician Keith Atack (formerly of pop band Child). On her father's side of the family, her uncle was actor Simon Shelton. On her mother's side, she is the first cousin twice removed of musician Paul McCartney and the niece of comedian Ted Robbins and actress Amy Robbins.

At the age of 16, she left school and moved to London, along with her sister Martha, and still lives there as of 2022.

Career

Acting career
Aside from The Inbetweeners (E4), Atack has appeared in films such as the remake of Dad's Army opposite Catherine Zeta-Jones and Bill Nighy. She appeared alongside Harvey Keitel and Gabriel Byrne in the British film Lies We Tell, and has performed in television programmes such as Rock and Chips (BBC), Little Crackers (Sky1), The Keith Lemon Sketch Show (ITV2) and Tracey Ullman's Show (BBC).

Other ventures
Atack was a contestant on Dancing on Ice in 2010. She was partnered with professional ice skater Fred Palascak; they were voted off in the eighth week. In 2011, Atack presented a stylised public service announcement titled Ready, Steady, Drink, highlighting the dangers of drinking alcohol.

On 12 November 2018, Atack was confirmed to be participating in that year's series of I'm a Celebrity...Get Me Out of Here! She eventually finished in second place behind Harry Redknapp. She released her first book, Are We There Yet?: To indignity ... and beyond!, on 31 October 2019. In November 2019 she began co-hosting I'm a Celebrity: Extra Camp alongside Joel Dommett and Adam Thomas.

In 2020, Atack starred in a new series called The Emily Atack Show, featuring a mixture of stand-up comedy, impressions, and stories about her life experiences including dating, relationships and the pressures of social media and fame. She was a team captain on panel show Celebrity Juice from 2020 until its cancellation in 2022.

In 2023, Atack presented the documentary, Asking for It?, about her experiences of cyberflashing and sexual harassment, and talked about the explicit messages she was sent on social media. It aired on BBC Two on 31 January 2023.

Filmography

Theatre credits

See also
 List of Dancing on Ice contestants
 List of I'm a Celebrity...Get Me Out of Here! (British TV series) contestants

References

External links

 
 

1989 births
Living people
21st-century British actresses
21st-century English actresses
21st-century English comedians
Actresses from Bedfordshire
English female models
English film actresses
English television actresses
English women comedians
I'm a Celebrity...Get Me Out of Here! (British TV series) participants
People from Ampthill